27 Corps, 27th Corps, Twenty Seventh Corps, or XXVII Corps may refer to:

 XXVII Reserve Corps (German Empire), a unit during World War I
 XXVII Army Corps (Wehrmacht), a German unit during World War II
 27th Army Corps (Russian Empire), a Russian unit during World War I
 27th Mechanized Corps (Soviet Union), a Soviet unit during World War II
 27th Air Defense Corps, a Soviet Cold War era unit

See also
 List of military corps by number
 27th Army (disambiguation)
 27th Battalion (disambiguation)
 27th Brigade (disambiguation)
 27th Division (disambiguation)
 27th Regiment (disambiguation)
 27 Squadron (disambiguation)